Jorun is a Norwegian feminine given name and a version of Jorunn. People with the name include:

Jorun Askersrud Nygaard (1929–2012), Norwegian skier
Jørun Drevland (born 1944), Norwegian politician
Jorun Erdal (born 1963), Norwegian singer and musical theatre artist
Jorun Marie Kvernberg (born 1979), Norwegian musician
Jorun Solheim (born 1944), Norwegian social anthropologist
Jorun Stiansen (born 1984), Norwegian pop singer 
Jorun Thørring (born 1955), Norwegian writer

Norwegian feminine given names